Manas Ghale (Nepali: मानस घले; born October 19, 1984) is a Nepalese rapper, singer and songwriter He started his career from 2000 A.D.

Awards and nominations
Won: Kantipur FM Awards
Won: Image FM Awards

Discography
Sukeko Jiu Ma Loorey ko Bal
Manasick Medicine
Malai Maan Pardaina Timro Rap

Tours
India
 Hong Kong
South Korea
Dubai
Australia
USA
United Kingdom
Germany
Japan

References

1984 births
Living people
Nepalese singer-songwriters
Nepali-language singers
Musicians from Kathmandu
Nepalese hip hop singers